Roll Call Records is an independent record label in Los Angeles, California. President and founder Rob Abelow started the label in 2012 to release albums by artists on the management roster. Shortly thereafter, Roll Call Records partnered with Warner Music's independent label group.

In 2017, Roll Call Records entered a partnership with The Orchard and House Arrest/Fat Possum for distribution and services and opened its first international office in Brighton, UK.

Typhoon's album White Lighter, also released by Roll Call, reached No. 2 on the Billboard Heatseekers charts and No. 98 on Billboard Top 200.

In 2017, Roll Call also opened a singles label, Highland Park.

Current artists 
 The Dig
 El Ten Eleven
 Estrons
 Isbells
 ON AN ON
 Night Drive
 Plastic Picnic (Highland Park)
 River Whyless
 Rubblebucket
 Sego
 Summer Camp
 Tigercub
 Typhoon
 Valley Queen

Former artists 
 Geographer
 The Lighthouse and the Whaler
 Royal Canoe
 Wintersleep

References

External links 
 Official website


Record labels established in 2012
American independent record labels